David Ashton may refer to:

 David Ashton (botanist) (1927–2005), Australian botanist and ecologist
 David Ashton (actor) (born 1941), Scottish actor and writer